George Albert Bowater (26 October 1911 – 1966) was an English professional footballer who played as an outside forward in the Football League for Mansfield Town, Bradford Park Avenue and York City and in non-League football for Shirebrook, Burton Town, Frickley Colliery and Peterborough United.

References

1911 births
People from Shirebrook
Footballers from Derbyshire
1966 deaths
English footballers
Association football forwards
Shirebrook Miners Welfare F.C. players
Mansfield Town F.C. players
Bradford (Park Avenue) A.F.C. players
York City F.C. players
Burton Town F.C. players
Frickley Athletic F.C. players
Peterborough United F.C. players
English Football League players
Date of death missing
Place of death missing